Huawei Mate S is an Android smartphone developed by Huawei as part of the Huawei Mate series.

Specifications
The phone has 3 GB RAM, it has 32 GB, 64 GB and 128 GB of internal storage and is connectable using Bluetooth and Wi-Fi. It does have GPS.

Functions
Shortcut to functions can be triggered by "Knuckle" on the screen - such as "Knuckle S" for long screen capture, "Knuckle C" for camera etc.

References

Further reading
 International Business Times
 The Irish Times
 The Journal
 The National

Android (operating system) devices
Mobile phones introduced in 2015
Discontinued smartphones
Huawei mobile phones
Mobile phones with pressure-sensitive touch screen